Phạm Hoàng Lâm (born 6 March 1993) is a Vietnamese footballer who plays as a centre-back for V.League 1 club .

References 

1993 births
Living people
Vietnamese footballers
Association football central defenders
V.League 1 players
Footballers at the 2014 Asian Games
Asian Games competitors for Vietnam
Long An FC players
Hoang Anh Gia Lai FC players